= Office de Formation et de Documentation Internationale =

The Office de Formation et de Documentation Internationale (OFDI) organized law seminars in Paris, France, and Brussels, Belgium, in the 1980s.
